The Batalanda Detention Centre was an alleged detention centre in Butalanda which was used to torture and exterminate members of the Janatha Vimukthi Peramuna (JVP) during the JVP uprising of 1988–1989, who launched a second armed revolt against the then elected UNP (United National Party) government led by President Ranasinghe Premadasa.

Unlike in the previous uprising, the JVP relied heavily on the use of assassinations of important religious and political figures, subversion, and terror attacks. The government responded just as brutally; the government has been accused of using detention camps in several locations, including Batalanda, to quell the JVP uprising. The camps were said to be run by anti-subversive units of the police who were tasked with destroying rebels.

It is believed that nearly 5,000 to 10,000 JVP activists were brutally tortured and killed in the Batalanda camp alone. Incumbent President and current leader of the UNP Ranil Wickremesinghe has been accused of being the political authority behind the alleged detention centre. The Batalanda commission was appointed by the government of Chandrika Kumaratunga to look into the violations of human rights and crimes committed in the Batalanda torture and detention centre. In its report, the commission recommended the government to take legal action against then-opposition leader Ranil Wickremesinghe and to strip him of his civic rights, which would have made him ineligible to run for elections. No legal action has been taken against Wickremesinghe by any government to date, however, and many who were arrested for their involvement in the alleged killings have been revealed to be from organizations such as the Sri Lanka Mahajana Party, a political party founded in 1984 by Kumaratunga and her husband, Vijaya Kumaratunga, who was assassinated by the JVP in 1988.

References 

Janatha Vimukthi Peramuna
Prisons in Sri Lanka
Enforced disappearances in Sri Lanka
Political repression
Sri Lanka and state terrorism
1987–1989 JVP insurrection